GAZ or Gorkovsky avtomobilny zavod is a Russian automotive manufacturer located in Nizhny Novgorod, formerly known as Gorky (Горький) (1932–1990). It is the core subsidiary of GAZ Group Holding, which is itself part of Basic Element industrial group. JSC Russian Machines is the controlling shareholder in OAO GAZ.

History

Early history

In May 1929 the Soviet Union signed an agreement with the American Ford Motor Company. Under its terms, the Soviets agreed to purchase $13 million worth of automobiles and parts, while Ford agreed to give technical assistance until 1938 to construct an integrated automobile-manufacturing plant at Nizhny Novgorod. The factory was founded and production started on 1 January 1932. At the time the factory was known as Nizhny Novgorod Automobile Plant, short NAZ (Nizhegorodskiy avtomobilny zavod), full name Nizhny Novgorod Automobile Plant named after V. M. Molotov (Nizhegorodskiy avtomobilny zavod imeni V. M. Molotova), after the Soviet minister Vyacheslav Molotov. In 1932 the plant produced its first automobiles, GAZ-AA (originally known as NAZ-AA, as they were manufactured before Nizhny Novgorod became Gorky) truck and GAZ-A passenger car (manufactured after Nizhny Novgorod became Gorky). The cars were based on the Ford Model AA and Ford Model A, respectively.

In 1933, the factory's name changed to Gorkovsky avtomobilny zavod, or GAZ, when the city was renamed after Maxim Gorky.

The GAZ-A was succeeded by the more modern GAZ-M1 (based largely on the four-cylinder version of the Ford Model B), produced from 1936 to 1942. The M letter stands for Molotovets ('of Molotov's fame'), it was the origin of the car's nickname, M'ka (эмка).

During the war, GAZ assembled Chevrolet G7107 and G7117 (G7107 with winch) from parts shipped from the USA under Lend Lease.

Postwar period

At that time, GAZ engineers worked to develop an all-new car model to enter production once hostilities ended. Called the GAZ-M20 Pobeda (Victory), this affordably-priced sedan with streamlined, fastback styling, entered production in 1946 and was produced by GAZ until 1958. (Licensed production under the name Warszawa continued in Polish FSO until the 1970s). It was the first Soviet car with electric windshield wipers (rather than mechanical- or vacuum-operated ones). 

GAZ also made GAZ-12 ZIM, GAZ-21 and GAZ-24 Volga and the luxury cars GAZ-13 and GAZ-14 Chaika. The ZIM was the first GAZ car to feature the leaping deer hood ornament. The GAZ-21 made its public debut in 1955, with a three cars on a demonstration drive from Moscow to the Crimea, two automatic models and a manual. It was launched in 1956 and became a symbol of the whole Soviet epoch. The car offered front seats able to fold flat and came standard with cigarette lighter and a radio at a time when most American-built cars did not have a radio. A small number of Volgas with the  Chaika engine, automatic transmission, and power steering were built for the KGB as the M23, 603 were built in 1962–1970. As the car's leading engineer Boris Dekhtyar recalled, the new version of the Volga had improved brake pads and reached a higher top speed of over 170 km/h; it was well received. The new engine produced 195 h.p. at 4,400 rpm. 

In the 1960s GAZ plant renewed its truck range by launching such models as GAZ-52, GAZ-53А and GAZ-66. In the 1960s and 1970s, the plant was overhauled and updated; 1962 saw it fitted with the Soviet Union's first automated precision shop. In 1994 the plant started production of GAZelle light commercial vehicles.

The plant became AvtoGAZ, with the integration of its various subcontractors, on 24 August 1971; the same year, it was awarded the Order of Lenin. GAZ produced its ten millionth vehicle in March 1981. In the late 1990s GAZ was deemed to be the best managed Russian automotive manufacturer.

SibAl takeover

In November 2000 GAZ was acquired in a hostile takeover by SibAl. In March 2003 GAZ declared that the production of passenger cars was no longer a priority for the company, and plans to release a new GAZ-3115 model had been abandoned.

In 2006, GAZ made a move on the LDV company based in Birmingham, England, and acquired the van maker from the venture capital group Sun European Partners, LLP in July of that year. GAZ said that they planned to market the MAXUS (LDV's new Panel-van that was released in January 2005) into the rest of Europe and Asia. GAZ proposed to increase production in the LDV plant in England, while also commencing production of the MAXUS in a new plant in Russia. However, due to the recession, the production at the LDV plant was halted and the plant was sold to a Chinese company called ECO Concept in 2009.

As then DaimlerChrysler modernized its Sterling Heights Assembly plant in 2006, the old Chrysler Sebring / Dodge Stratus assembly line and tooling was sold to GAZ and was shipped to Nizhny Novgorod in Russia.  Since then GAZ car facility is used for contract manufacturing for Volkswagen and General Motors.

Andersson leadership

In 2009, Bo Andersson, former Vice-President of General Motors, was invited to become a President/CEO of GAZ Group.

In 2010, GAZ upgraded its model range by launching new GAZelle-BUSINESS lineup with diesel and petrol engines and LPG equipment. 

In November 2010 the company decided to end production of the Volga Siber, its last GAZ passenger car model, and to discontinue the GAZ Volga range. In December 2010, GAZ Group signed a memorandum of understanding with Daimler on contract manufacturing of Mercedes-Benz Sprinter at GAZ plant in Nizhny Novgorod. It is expected that production will start in 2013. 

In February 2011, General Motors and GAZ Group signed an agreement on contract assembly of the new Chevrolet Aveo car at GAZ plant in Nizhny Novgorod. As of December 2012, production was underway with an expected annual production of 30,000 vehicles.

In June 2011, Volkswagen Group Rus and GAZ Group signed a long-term agreement on contract manufacturing at GAZ plant with total investment of €200 million. It is planned to produce Škoda Yeti, the new Volkswagen Jetta and Škoda Octavia. The total production volume in the peak years will be about 110,000 vehicles. In November 2011, under the contract manufacturing agreement, GAZ started SKD assembly of Škoda Yeti; full-cycle production started in December 2012.

Recent developments
In April 2019, GAZ asked for a $468 million bailout from the Russian government, saying that US sanctions on Oleg Deripaska and his assets put the company at risk of default. On July 4, 2019, workers from GAZ protested against the US sanctions in front of the US embassy in Moscow as an opposition to measures they claim will lead to the bankruptcy of the company.

In November 2021, "GAZ Group" announced that its division, "Silovye Agregaty", would be ready for mass production of hydrogen engines in 2,5 years.

See also

 List of GAZ vehicles
 Automobile model numbering system in the Soviet Union and Russia
 History of Ford Motor Company

References

External links

 Official site of the plant
 GAZ official website 
 GAZ official website 
 GAZ automotive history 

 
Vehicle manufacturing companies established in 1932
Russian brands
Truck manufacturers of Russia
Car manufacturers of Russia
Truck manufacturers of the Soviet Union
Defence companies of the Soviet Union
Soviet Union–United States relations
Car brands
Luxury motor vehicle manufacturers
Manufacturing companies based in Nizhniy Novgorod
Russian entities subject to the U.S. Department of the Treasury sanctions